Five Finger Mountain may refer to:

 Besh Barmag Mountain (Beş Barmaq or "five finger") in Azerbaijan
 Pentadaktylos (Πενταδάκτυλος or "fivefinger") aka Beşparmak Dağları (fivefinger mountain), a mountain in Cyprus
 Wuzhi Mountain (五指山 or "five finger mountain") in Hainan, China
 Five Fingers Group, a group of five peaks in British Columbia, Canada

See also
 5 Fingers (disambiguation)